Narrow-leaved palm lily may apply to at least two plant species in the genus Cordyline:

 Cordyline congesta
 Cordyline stricta